Mormogystia equatorialis is a moth in the family Cossidae. It is found in Kenya.

The wingspan is about 26 mm. The ground colour of the forewings is brown. The head, thorax and abdomen are white.

References

Moths described in 1933
Cossinae